Formosa is a department of Formosa Province (Argentina).

References 

Departments of Formosa Province